William Rule may refer to:

Sir William Rule (Surveyor of the Navy), British Surveyor of the Navy during the late 18th and early 19th centuries
William Rule (editor) (1839–1928), newspaper publisher from Knoxville, Tennessee, United States
William Harris Rule (1802–1890), British Methodist missionary and writer